Pôle emploi (English: employment centre) is a French governmental agency which registers unemployed people, helps them find jobs and provides them with financial aid. The agency was created in 2008, resulting from the merger between the ANPE and the ASSEDIC (or Assédic). The agency employs 45,000 civil servants. The merger had been expected for a very long time, for the two agencies had been created more than forty years before.

Creation
The ASSEDIC (Association pour l'emploi dans l'industrie et le commerce) was created in 1958 to provide social benefits to unemployed people. The ANPE (Agence Nationale Pour l’Emploi) was created in 1967.

In December 2007, Christine Lagarde, Minister of the Economy, unveiled the law to the government.

On 13 February 2008, the law implementing the fusion was officially voted on. Pôle emploi has existed legally since 19 December 2008.

Since then, Pôle emploi has a single phone number (39.49) to get information on registration and benefits. There is also a single web page (pole-emploi.fr). The ANPE and Assedic logos have disappeared from every branch.

However, the Unedic (or Unédic) remained in existence, but it became an independent agency managed by the "social partners" (trade unions and company representatives).

Aims
The merger was an electoral pledge of candidate Nicolas Sarkozy during the French presidential election of 2007.

The merger was part of the pledge to cut the unemployment rate to 5% by 2012. It also aimed at improving the efficiency of public services provided to unemployed people.

Agents of both ANPE and Assedic had to adapt to the fusion: 30,000 out of 45,000 agents had to follow a one-year training course.

Missions
The missions the agency is entrusted with are ANPE and Assedic's missions combined. Pôle emploi receives those that have declared unemployment. It provides them with social benefits. The agency provides advice and supervises job hunting, as well as providing a platform to help companies find and hire workers.

Once a candidate is enrolled into Pôle emploi each person is appointed a personal adviser who: helps them with their job searches, orients candidates toward additional training and guides their eventual integration back into the work force. 
Whereas there were around 60 unemployed advised by one ANPE agents, there now around 30 unemployed for each Pole emploi agent.

The agency also helps companies to find candidates for a job. They publish job offers, select themselves candidates and follow their first months in the job. They develop partnerships with companies to advise them.

The agency focuses on people notably affected by long-term unemployment, young people, seniors, and RSA-beneficiaries (state funded welfare).

Pôle Emploi collect workers' contributions to finance unemployment benefits, paid by salaries. However, the government of François Fillon said this mission would be entrusted to the URSSAF.

Measurements
Pole Emploi publish monthly statistics of job-seekers. It takes into account only people registered with Pole Emploi, and distinguishes between various categories of job-seekers.

Before 2009, the unemployment was measured by the ANPE with 8 categories:
 Category 1 : jobless and available people seeking a full-time and permanent contract job
 Category 2 : jobless and available people seeking a half-time and permanent contract job
 Category 3 : jobless and available people seeking a fixed-term contract job
 Category 4 : jobless and non-available people seeking a job
 Category 5 : job-seekers already having a job
 Category 6 : jobless and non-available people seeking a full-time and permanent contract job
 Category 7 : jobless and non-available people seeking a half-time and permanent contract job
 Category 8 : jobless and non-available people seeking a fixed-term contract job

With the new system, Pole Emploi uses 5 categories:
 category A : jobless people
 category B : job-seekers working for a short period of time (up to 78 hours a month)
 category C : job-seekers working for a long period of time (more than 78 hours a month)
 category D : non-available job-seekers (because of learning, disease, for instance).
 category E : job-seekers already having a job

Difference with the ILO definition
The concept of job seekers registered at Pole Emploi is different from that of uses by the ILO: some registered job-seekers are not unemployed according to the ILO and conversely some unemployed according to the ILO definition are not registered to Pole Emploi. Data on unemployed people are based on administrative records in center jobs. The statistics are legal rules: the Pole Emploi centers can accept people according to their availability and their activity.

According to the ILO definition, an unemployed person is a person of working age (i.e. aged 15 years or older) who does not work, not even one hour during the week, who is available to take a job within 15 days and who actively sought a job in the previous month. In each country, a statistical survey is conducted to check whether these criteria are met. In France, the INSEE is the body responsible for this survey, it publishes it every three months, while Pole Emploi delivers monthly statistics. There are always more people registered by Pole Emploi than people officially recognized as unemployed by the ILO.

References

Official texts
 Official text of the law in French
 Debates at the National Assembly
 Report on the merger, by the Senate

External links

 
Assedics the local agencies have retain their own website, despite the fusion.
Unédic the agency have become an independent agency managed by trade unions.

Government agencies of France
Employment agencies of France
Labor in France
Public employment service